Shri Raghunatha Tirtha (IAST:Śrī Raghunātha Tīrtha) (1405 – 1502), was a Hindu philosopher, scholar and saint. He served as the pontiff of Uttaradi Math from 1442–1502. He was the 19th in succession from Madhvacharya.

Life
Raghunatha Tirtha was a contemporary of Vibhudendra Tirtha, the progenitor of the Raghavendra Math and  Sripadaraja, a pontiff of mutt at Mulbagal (now known by the name Sripadaraja Mutt), Vyasatirtha and Purandara Dasa. It so happened that when Lakshminarayana Tirtha was initiated in renunciation and recognised as Svarnavarna Tirtha's successor to pontificate, he was sent to Vibhudendra Tirtha for higher learning, where he became an expert in Dvaita system. A test of his knowledge was held under supervision of Raghunatha Tirtha. Lakshminarayana excelled in the test by commenting upon a major text of the system. It was Raghunatha Tirtha who conferred upon him the name Sripadaraja or Sripadaraya. Sripadarajashtakam also mentions Sripadaraja's joint pilgrimage with Raghunatha Tirtha to Benares. Sripadaraja was a close associate of Raghunatha Tirtha. Raghunatha Tirtha died in 1502 and his mortal remains were enshrined in the mutt at Malkheda. He was succeeded by his disciple.

Works
Puja-vidhi, a treatise on Āhnika rites.

References

Bibliography

External links
Raghunatha Tirtha Biography on uttaradimath.org

Dvaita Vedanta
Madhva religious leaders
Scholars from Karnataka
Indian Hindu saints
Dvaitin philosophers
Uttaradi Math
1502 deaths
15th-century Indian philosophers